Helge Solvang (3 June 1913 – 26 September 2013) was a Norwegian war sailor, centenarian and at his death Norway's oldest elected politician, representing the Labour Party in Balsfjord municipal council.

References

1913 births
2013 deaths
People from Balsfjord
Norwegian sailors
Labour Party (Norway) politicians
Troms politicians
Norwegian centenarians
Men centenarians